Lăpușna County was a county (Romanian: județ) in Moldova from 1998 to 2003, with the seat at Hîncești. It bordered the counties of Ungheni, Chișinău County, Tighina, and Cahul, the autonomous region of Gagauzia in Moldova, Ukraine (on the southeast), and România (on the west).

Geography
In the county were 149 localities of which five were cities: Basarabeasca, Cimișlia, Iargara, Hîncești, and Leova.

References

 Counties of Moldova, Statoids.com

Counties of Moldova
Counties of Bessarabia
1998 establishments in Moldova
2003 disestablishments in Moldova
States and territories established in 1998
States and territories disestablished in 2003